Roger FitzJohn (died 1248/1249) was an English feudal baron, Lord of Clavering, Warkworth and Horsford. He was the son of John FitzRobert and Ada de Baillol.

Marriage and issue
He married Isabel de Dunbar, daughter of Patrick Dunbar, 6th Earl of Dunbar and Euphemia, and is known to have had the following issue:

Robert fitzRoger, married Margery la Zouche, had issue.
Euphemia, firstly married William Comyn of Kilbride, and secondly Andrew de Moray of Petty, had issue.

Citations

References
Burke, John. A genealogical and heraldic History of the Commoners of Great Britain and Ireland, enjoying territorial possessions or high official rank, but uninvested with heritable honours, Volume 1, Colburn, 1834.

13th-century English people
English feudal barons
People from Warkworth, Northumberland